Heggem (or Osmarka) is a village in Gjemnes Municipality in Møre og Romsdal county, Norway. The Osmarka Chapel is located here. The village has a good view of the mountain Reinsfjellet, located to the northeast.

References

Gjemnes
Villages in Møre og Romsdal